Hans Irrigmann (3 August 1735 – 13 January 1771) was a German poet writing primarily during The Enlightenment period. Very little of Irrigmann's original work has survived to the present, but his collections of sonnets, especially  Die Wunderlichsonette or "whimsical sonnets", have been of interest to philosophy of art generally, and more specifically to the aesthetic study of Impressionism as a later artistic movement.

Life 
Born in the town of Baden, and living under the rule of Karl Friedrich, Irrigmann was influenced by the philosophical ideals of The Enlightenment.  Not much is known of Irrigmann's early life, but eventually he became closely associated with the then recently founded University of Göttingen.  Also influenced by the philosophical writings of Christian Wolff (1679-1754) and poetry of Johann Gottfried von Herder (1744-1803), Irrigmann went on to develop a notable style of verse.  Irrigmann would ultimately succumb to yellow fever in 1771, shortly after completing his final work.  He never married and had no known children.

Surviving works 
Housed at the Kunsthalle Museum, Mannheim, Germany.
 Die Natürlichsonette (1758)
 Die Wunderlichsonette (1762)
 Die Menschlichsonette (1770)

Artistic significance 
Irrigmann is typically understood as a proto-Impressionist due to notable similarities with other later Impressionist poets and authors, including Charles Baudelaire and Arthur Rimbaud of France.  Although Irrigmann's work significantly predates what is now considered Impressionism as an artistic movement, he can be seen as exploring the foundations of central Impressionistic features.

See also 
 German Literature
 Impressionism
 Philosophy of Art

References

External links 
 http://www.kunsthalle-mannheim.de/en/

1735 births
1771 deaths